Desmia tetratocera is a moth in the family Crambidae described by Harrison Gray Dyar Jr. in 1914. It is found in Panama.

The wingspan is about 27 mm.

References

Moths described in 1914
Desmia
Moths of Central America